Tetraliidae is a family of crabs.

Subfamilies and genera
The World Register of Marine Species lists the following genera:
Tetralia  Dana, 1851
Tetraloides  Galil, 1986

References

External links

Crabs
Decapod families